Alloteuthis is a genus of squids from the pencil squid family Loliginidae which has been considered a subgenus of the genus Loligo but both molecular analyses and morphological-anatomical analyses support the separation of these two taxa.

Species
Alloteuthis as currently recognised comprises three species:

Alloteuthis africana Adam, 1950, African squid
Alloteuthis media (Linnaeus, 1758), middlesize squid
Alloteuthis subulata (Lamarck, 1798), European common squid

References

Squid
Cephalopod genera